Sherkat-e Darafshan is a village in Ahmadabad Rural District, in the Central District of Nazarabad County, Alborz Province, Iran. At the 2006 census, its population was 46, in 7 families.

References 

Populated places in Nazarabad County